Johnny Ray Bodiford (June 14, 1936 - July 12, 1989) was an American insurance agent from Selmer, Tennessee who served as a Republican member of the Tennessee House of Representatives from the 70th district (Hardin and McNairy counties and parts of Wayne, Chester and Hardeman counties) from 1973 to 1976. He succeeded fellow Republican (and insurance agent) Granville Hinton, and was succeeded by Republican Herman L. Wolfe, Sr.

He was a member of the Tennessee 1977 Limited Constitutional Convention.

In 1980, he ran what was described as a "strong campaign" against longtime incumbent state senator and Lieutenant Governor John S. Wilder, but was unable to defeat him.

Personal life 
He was married to Bernice Nixon Bodiford, who is listed as his widow in her March 2005 obituary. He was a member of the Churches of Christ, and a Freemason.

References 

1936 births
1989 deaths
Businesspeople from Tennessee
Insurance agents
Republican Party members of the Tennessee House of Representatives
People from McNairy County, Tennessee
20th-century American businesspeople
20th-century American politicians